111 Squadron or 111th Squadron may refer to:

No. 111 Squadron RAF, a unit of the United Kingdom Royal Air Force
111th Reconnaissance Squadron, a unit of the United States Air Force
111th Space Operations Squadron, a unit of the United States Air Force
111 Squadron, Republic of Singapore Air Force

See also
111th Division (disambiguation)
111th Regiment (disambiguation)